Milagros "Mila" Martínez Domínguez (born 23 April 1985) is a Spanish football manager.

Early life
Born in Cuenca, Spain, Martínez lived in her family's village, Fuentelespino de Haro, until she turned 18. Later, she played as a defender for a Spanish college team, as well as Segunda División side Fundación Albacete. She later went on to work as a coach, and then youth team co-ordinator, for Fundación Albacete.

Managerial career
After spending less than a year in Spain managing the women's team of CD Atlético Tomelloso, Martínez received an offer to manage overseas. She was appointed manager of Suzuka Point Getters in January 2019. With this appointment, she became the first female manager in Japanese men's football at any level.

Her first victory came in a 4–1 win over Tegevajaro Miyazaki in March 2019. Her contract was renewed ahead of the 2020 season, and then again for the 2021 season.

After winning in the first round of the 2021 Emperor's Cup, Martínez's Point Getters were drawn against Vissel Kobe.

On 5 July 2021, Suzuka Point Getters announced Martínez's departure from the club by mutual consent and published her gratitude to fans throughout her tenure.

Managerial statistics

References

1985 births
Living people
Spanish women's footballers
Women's association football defenders
Segunda Federación (women) players
Fundación Albacete players
Spanish football managers
Suzuka Point Getters managers
Spanish expatriate sportspeople in Japan
Expatriate football managers in Japan
Spanish expatriate football managers
Primera División (women) managers